Noureddin, Son of Iran is the memoirs of Sayyid Noureddin Afi from the 80 months of his participation in the Iran–Iraq war. Noureddin, Son of Iran led to Afi's reputation in Iran after it was published by Sureye Mehr Publication in 2011. In 1994, Mousa Ghayour recorded the memoirs of Noureddin Afi in Turkish and it was presented as a written book by Masoume Sepehri years later. َThis book consisted of 18 chapters along with photographs. The narrator mentions a dream as the reason of producing this war memoir. Noureddin, Son of Iran received an honorable mention in the "Memoir" category of the Jalal Al-e Ahmad Literary Awards (2012).

Narrative
Sayyid Noureddin wants to participate the Iran–Iraq war, but he is not allowed at first because he is still young. He tries repeatedly and finally they let him go to war. He attends a military training course in the fall of 1980, and heads toward the western zones of Iran to serve in the Sepah of the Mehabad. He moves to the southern war zones along with his brother, Sadegh. Nourreddin loses his brother in an Iraqi airstrike. With shrapnel in his body they make him go under surgery in the hospitals of Mashhad and Kermanshah many times. But he does not recover well because he is severely damaged in the face, eyes and stomach. Due to the severe injuries on his face, his countenance changes when he is only 18. In 1984, he marries a 16-year-old girl named Masoume and their child is born 4 years later. The war finishes but he is still suffering the injuries and he misses his lovely friends, especially Amir Maralbash who was killed in the war.

Why it was written
In the last page of his memoir, Afi expresses his motivation for recounting his war memories as such:

Animated movie

Noureddin, Son of Iran is a computer animated movie directed by Meisam Hosseini. The movie consists of 30 parts of 15 minutes each. Famous Iranian artists such as Atila Pesyani, Pejman Bazeghi, Ali Saleh Ala and Masoud Forutan worked on the movie.

See also
One Woman's War: Da (Mother)
That Which That Orphan Saw
Fortune Told in Blood
Journey to Heading 270 Degrees
Baba Nazar (book)

References

Iran–Iraq War memoirs
2011 non-fiction books
Memoirs adapted into films
Iranian books
Iranian memoirs